Candela  is one of the 38 municipalities of Coahuila, in north-eastern Mexico. The municipal seat lies at Candela. The municipality covers an area of 2,305.5 km2.

As of 2005, the municipality had a total population of 1,672.

References

Municipalities of Coahuila